Christofle is a French manufacturer and retailer of high-end tableware, jewelry and home accessories. Founded in Paris by Charles Christofle in 1830, the company is known for making fine silverware. Christofle was acquired in 2012 by one of its shareholders, the Chalhoub family.

History
The company was established in 1830, when jeweler Charles Christofle (1805–1863) assumed management of a jewelry workshop belonging to his wife's family. The company introduced electrolytic gilding and silver plating to France in 1842. Among the company's product lines are silver picture frames, crystal vases and glassware, porcelain dinnerware, and silver jewelry and holloware. 

In 1951, Christofle agreed with Ernest Cardeilhac to purchase the Cardeilhac firm's tools and patterns. The Cardeilhac firm had been founded in 1804 by Antoine-Vital Cardeilhac, who became a well-known silversmith in Paris.

During the 20th century, Christofle remained under the control and ownership of the founding family, which was represented in later years by Maurizio Borletti. The company was publicly traded until 1998, when Borletti and others took the firm private. In 2012, Christofle was bought by the Chalhoub family.

Christofle manufactures its products in France and in Brazil. The products are sold worldwide through 75 Pavillon Christofle retail stores, and also through 400 department stores and specialty shops.

Artists and designers such as the Parisian silversmith Antoine Perrin, Man Ray, Jean Cocteau, Gio Ponti, Andrée Putman, Martin Szekely, Ito Morabito (Ora-Ïto), Xiao Hui Wang and Richard Hutten are among those whose creations have been made by Christofle.

See also
Musée Bouilhet-Christofle

References

Bibliography
 Style on a Silver Platter, India Today, 2/28/08
 
 
 The History of Silver, Claude Blair, Ballantine Publishing Group, 1987
 Modern Art of Metalwork: Brohan-Museum Collection VI, Berlin, 2001
 (fr) Des cheminées dans la plaine: cent ans d'industrie à Saint-Denis, autour de Christofle (1830-1930),  creaphis editions, 1998 - 203 pages, .
 (fr) Christofle le maître de l'argent, Le Point, 2010

External links

 Official website
 A timeline of Christofle maker's marks
 Christofle  at Cooper Hewitt, Smithsonian Design Museum
 Christofle on Artnet
 Mobilier national (France) collections

French silversmiths
Manufacturing companies based in Paris
Design companies established in 1830
Manufacturing companies established in 1830
1830 establishments in France
Purveyors to the Imperial and Royal Court
Metalsmiths from Paris